I Wanna Love Somebody is an album by the American musician Angela Bofill, released in 1993. Bofill supported the album with a North American tour.

Production
The album was produced primarily by Eve Nelson. Bofill cowrote some of its songs.

Critical reception

Entertainment Weekly wrote that "songs like 'Always a Part of Me', a breezy ballad, prove she’s still a sensual soul siren." USA Today determined that Bofill "still has a rich, multi-octave voice, and a knack for penning ballads that stick to the ribs." The Orlando Sentinel stated that "syrupy synths clog the production much of the time, but Bofill keeps her vocals tasteful even when the setting is tacky."

Track listing
"I Wanna Love Somebody" (Eve Nelson) – 4:06
"I Wonder" (Eve Nelson) – 5:33
"Never Too Much" (Angela Bofill, Eve Nelson) – 4:30
"Heavenly Love" (Angela Bofill, Eve Nelson) – 5:14
"Always a Part of Me" (Steven Birch, Preston Glass, Darrell Smith) – 5:12
"Te Amo" (Angela Bofill, Eve Nelson) – 4:49
"Essence of My Light" (Eve Nelson) – 5:12
"I Still Believe in Love" (Angela Bofill, Ann Curless, Eve Nelson) – 4:50
"We Almost Had It Right" (Eve Nelson) – 3:42
"Amor Celestial" ["Heavenly Love", Spanish Version] – 5:10

Personnel 
Adam Kudzin – engineer, assistant engineer
Amy Keyes – background vocals
Andy Snitzer – saxophone
Angela Bofill – vocals, background vocals
Brenda White – background vocals
Carl Burnett – guitar
Chris Botti – trumpet
Cindy Mizelle – background vocals
Derek Jordan – background vocals
Don Tittle – producer, engineer
Duane Sexton – engineer, assistant engineer
Earl Gardner – trumpet
Eve Nelson – piano, arranger
Francisco Centeno – bass guitar, background vocals
Gerard Julien – engineer, assistant engineer
Hugh Elliott – drums
Jeff Mironov – guitar
Joe Hornof – programming, drum sounds
Joe Hornoff – synthesizer, programming, sound effects
Kenny MacDougald – drums
Kirk Whalum – saxophone
Marc Shulman – guitar
Michael Dumas – engineer, assistant engineer
Neil Johnson – guitar
Nigel Green – engineer, mixing
Paulette McWilliams – background vocals
Pete Christensen – background vocals, engineer, mixing
Preston Glass – percussion, arranger, keyboards
Rob Mullins – keyboards
Scott Totten – guitar
Steven Birch – programming
Tao Gutierrez – percussion
Tom Coyne – mastering
Werner Vana Gierig – piano
Wilton Felder – bass guitar

References

Angela Bofill albums
1993 albums
Jive Records albums